Heinrich August Ludwig Wiggers (12 June 1803 – 13 February 1880) was a German pharmacist, chemist and botanist born in Altenhagen (today part of the city of Springe).

Trained as a pharmacist, in 1827 he relocated to the University of Göttingen, where he served as a laboratory assistant under chemist Friedrich Stromeyer (1776–1835), and later as an assistant to Friedrich Wöhler (1800–1882) until 1849.

In the meantime he earned his doctorate in 1835, later becoming a private lecturer (1837) and an associate professor of pharmacy (1848) at the university. From 1836 to 1850 he served as deputy inspector-general, later associate inspector-general, of all pharmacies in the Kingdom of Hanover (after 1860 this included the Principality of Lippe).

Selected writings 
 Inquisitio in Secale cornutum, Respectu inprimis habito ad ejus Ortum, Naturam et Partes constituentes nominatim eas, quibus Vires medicinales adscribendae sunt . Rosenbach, Gottingae [u.a.] 1831 Digital edition by the University and State Library Düsseldorf
 Die Trennung und Prüfung metallischer Gifte aus verdächtigen organischen Substanzen : mit Rücksicht auf Blausäure und Opium, 1835
 Grundriss der Pharmacognosie,  1840 Digital edition / Digital 2nd edition from 1847 by the University and State Library Düsseldorf
 Handbuch der Pharmacognosie, 1864. Digital edition by the University and State Library Düsseldorf

References 
 Heinrich August Ludwig Wiggers translated biography @ Allgemeine Deutsche Biographie

German pharmacists
19th-century German chemists
People from Hanover Region
Academic staff of the University of Göttingen
1803 births
1880 deaths